USS Sides (FFG-14) is an  guided-missile frigate that served in the US Navy.

History 
The eighth ship in the class, it was named for Admiral John H. Sides (died 1978).  Ordered from Todd Pacific Shipyards, Los Angeles Division, San Pedro, California, on 27 February 1976 as part of the FY76 program, Sides was laid down on 7 August 1978, launched on 19 May 1979, and commissioned on 30 May 1981. Sides ship sponsor was Mrs. Joanne Sides Watson, daughter of Admiral Sides.

Sides escorted tankers through the Straits of Hormuz during the Tanker War and participated in Operation Praying Mantis, the retaliation for Iranian mining operations. Sides was also part of the Surface Action Group under  when Iran Air 655 was shot down. Sides and her crew received a Meritorious Unit Commendation for the time period 13 April 1988 to 25 July 1988. The following year, Commander David R. Carlson authored an article in U.S. Naval Institute Proceedings in which Carlson called into question Vincennes' self-defense justification for the use of force and wrote, "Iran Air Flight 655 was shot down for no good reason." Capt. Will Rogers of Vincennes and David L. Dillon, speaking on behalf of the US Navy, challenged Carlson's account of events.

Sides and her crew received Navy E Ribbons for the 18-month period, July 1983 to December 1984, and for the years 1995, 1999 and 2000.

Sides was decommissioned on 28 February 2003 and as of 2014 was laid up in reserve at Naval Inactive Ships Maintenance Facility Bremerton, Washington.

Sides was expected to join the Portuguese Navy in 2006, together with her sister ship , but the Portuguese Navy dropped the offer and chose two Dutch s instead. Sides was expected to join the Turkish Navy in the summer of 2008, together with her sister ship George Philip, but the Turkish Navy dropped the offer.

Further reading

References

External links 

 Crew Group USS Sides FFG-14 pages
 Crew Page USS Sides FFG-14 pages
 MaritimeQuest USS Sides (FFG-14) pages

 

Ships built in Los Angeles
1979 ships
Oliver Hazard Perry-class frigates of the United States Navy